The Marketing Arm, also known as TMA, is a marketing and creative agency owned by Omnicom Group. With offices in New York City; Los Angeles; Chicago; Dallas; Wilton, Connecticut; Irvine, California; London; Manchester; São Paulo; and Shanghai. The agency specializes in strategy and execution across sports and entertainment, experiential, celebrity and influencer, digital and social, shopper and promotion, and content production.

Origins
Founded in 1993 by [[Ray Clark]], a former ProServ and Talent Sports International executive, The Marketing Arm was created as the event and corporate sports marketing division of Athletic Resource Management Inc. (ARM), a Memphis-based sports agency headed by Jimmy Sexton and Kyle Rote, Jr., a former professional soccer player in the NASL.

History
In January 2023, Trina Roffino was promoted from TMA's president to CEO.

In September 2022, TMA updated its branding with new colors, fonts, designs, and a new web domain and social media handle, wearetma.agency. The rebrand was covered by Adweek.

In 2019, Andrew Robinson was promoted from TMA’s president to CEO.

In 2016, Alcone, an Omnicom agency specializing in promotional, shopper and retail marketing, became a part of TMA.

In March 2016, Platinum Rye Entertainment (PRE), a sports and entertainment marketing consultancy specializing in sourcing celebrity talent, became part of TMA.

In 2011, Omnicom acquired Fanscape, a social media agency, and merged it into The Marketing Arm.

In October 2005, mobile marketing agency Ipsh! joined The Marketing Arm. Ipsh! was founded in June 2001 by Nihal Mehta and Mike Jelley. Ipsh creates and manages mobile marketing campaigns including SMS, MMS, mobile gaming, application development, mobile websites, and media planning and buying.

In 2004, Los Angeles-based agency Davie Brown Entertainment, which was founded in 1985 and acquired by Omnicom in 2001, joined The Marketing Arm.  In 2006, Davie Brown's talent division created the Davie-Brown Index (DBI), a celebrity index that determines a celebrity’s ability to influence brand affinity and consumer purchase intent.

In 2004, The Marketing Arm merged its sports consulting division with Millsport, a leading sports marketing firm owned by Omnicom, to form an agency retaining the Millsport brand name.  Founded in 1975 by Jim Millman, Millsport was a pioneer in using sports sponsorship as a branding tool.

In 2003, The Marketing Arm joined event operations with U.S. Marketing & Promotions (Usmp), an Omnicom sister agency based in Torrance, Calif. founded by Jason Moskowitz and Michael Napoliello.  Usmp now serves as The Marketing Arm's event unit, specializing in field sales and experiential marketing.

Omnicom Group acquired The Marketing Arm in June 1999.

Awards
In 2021, the agency was awarded its Gold PRO Award in "Best Brand Awareness" for the Advance Auto Parts "DieHard is Back" campaign.

In 2021, the agency was awarded its Gold PRO Award in "Best Buzz" for the Advance Auto Parts "DieHard is Back" campaign.

In 2021, the agency was awarded its Gold PRO Award in "Best Use of Video" for the Advance Auto Parts "DieHard is Back" campaign.

In 2021, the agency was awarded its Silver PRO Award in "Best Integrated Campaign" for the Advance Auto Parts "DieHard is Back" campaign.

In 2021, the agency was awarded its Silver PRO Award in "Best Entertainment Sponsorship or Tie-In" for the Advance Auto Parts "DieHard is Back" campaign.

In 2021, the agency was awarded its Gold PRO Award in "Best Use of Content Marketing" for the State Farm Twitch Charity Stream.

In 2021, the agency was awarded its Silver PRO Award in "Best Gaming or eSport Campaign" for the State Farm Twitch Charity Stream.

In 2021, the agency was awarded its Gold REGGIE Award in "Holiday or Seasonal Marketing" for the Wendy's "Scare Thru" Campaign.

In 2021, the agency was awarded its Silver REGGIE Award in "Influencer Marketing" for the SNICKERS "Hungriest Player" Campaign.

In 2021, the agency was awarded its Silver REGGIE Award in "Sports or eSports Marketing" for the SNICKERS "Hungriest Player" Campaign.

In 2021, the agency was awarded its Bronze REGGIE Award in "Creativity & Innovation" for the SNICKERS "Hungriest Player" Campaign.

In 2021, the agency was awarded its Silver REGGIE Award in "Holiday or Seasonal Marketing" for the "Bon Appé-Cheetos" Campaign. 

In 2021, the agency was awarded its Silver REGGIE Award in "Promotion Marketing" for the "Bon Appé-Cheetos" Campaign.

In 2021, the agency was awarded its Bronze REGGIE Award in "Content Marketing" for the "Bon Appé-Cheetos" Campaign.

In 2021, the agency was awarded its Silver REGGIE Award in "Partnership Marketing" for the Doritos "Valedictorian" Campaign.

In 2021, the agency was awarded its Gold National Addy Award in “Elements of Advertising: Cinematography” for the Advance Auto Parts "DieHard is Back" campaign.

In 2021, the agency was awarded its Gold Dallas and District Addy Awards in “Regional/National Television Commercial” for the Advance Auto Parts "DieHard is Back" campaign.

In 2021, the agency was awarded its Gold Dallas and District Addy Awards in “Branded Content & Entertainment for Television” for the Advance Auto Parts "DieHard is Back" campaign.

In 2021, the agency was awarded its Gold Dallas and District Addy Awards in “Cinematography—Single” for the Advance Auto Parts "DieHard is Back" campaign.

In 2020, the agency was awarded its Gold PRO Award in “Best Use of Content Marketing” for the State Farm “Vehicle Loan Illusions” Campaign.

In 2020, the agency was awarded its Silver PRO Award in “Best Buzz” for the State Farm Cheetos “House of Flamin’ Haute” Campaign.

In 2020, the agency was awarded its Silver PRO Award in “Best Campaign Targeting Millennials” for the State Farm Cheetos “House of Flamin’ Haute” Campaign.

In 2020, the agency was awarded its Silver PRO Award in “Best Use of Influencer Marketing” for the State Farm Cheetos “House of Flamin’ Haute” Campaign.

In 2020, the agency was awarded its Silver PRO Award in “Best Use of Content Marketing” for the Doritos “Spark the Beat” Campaign.

In 2020, the agency was awarded its Silver Ex Award in “Best Cause/Community Program” for the State Farm “Neighborhood of Good” Campaign.

In 2020, the agency was awarded its Gold Ex Award in “Best Sports Activation” for the Wendy’s “Sailgating” Campaign.

In 2020, the agency was awarded its Silver REGGIE Award in “Small Budget Brand Activation Marketing (Under $1MM)” for the State Farm “Vehicle Loan Illusions” Campaign.

In 2020, the agency was awarded its Silver REGGIE Award in “Promotion Marketing” for the Doritos “Spark the Beat” Campaign.

In 2020, the agency was awarded its Silver REGGIE Award in “Partnership Marketing” for the Doritos “Spark the Beat” Campaign.

In 2020, the agency was awarded its Bronze REGGIE Award in “Creativity and Innovation” for the Cheetos “House of Flamin’ Haute” Campaign.

In 2020, the agency was awarded its Gold REGGIE Award in “Influencer Marketing” for the Cheetos “House of Flamin’ Haute” Campaign.

In 2020, the agency was awarded its Gold REGGIE Award in “Experiential Marketing” for the Cheetos “House of Flamin’ Haute” Campaign.

In 2020, the agency was awarded its Gold REGGIE Award in “Experiential Marketing” for the Cheetos “House of Flamin’ Haute” Campaign.

In 2020, AdWeek Experiential named The Marketing Arm “Best Experiential Activation by a Packaged Goods Brand” for the Cheetos “House of Flamin’ Haute” Campaign.

In 2020, The One Show recognized the agency as “Best Branded Entertainment, Live Events” for the Cheetos “House of Flamin’ Haute” Campaign.

In 2019, the agency was awarded its Silver Pro Award in “Best Cause-Based Campaign” for the State Farm “Neighborhood of Good” Campaign.

In 2019, the agency was awarded its Bronze Pro Award in “Best Use of Event or Experiential Marketing” for the State Farm “Neighborhood of Good” Music Festival Experience.

In 2019, the agency was awarded its Gold Pro Award in “Best Sampling or Trial Recruitment” Campaign for the “Flamin' Hot Spot: A Restaurant by Cheetos” Campaign.

In 2019, the agency was awarded its Bronze Pro Award in “Best Campaign Targeting Millennials” for the “Flamin' Hot Spot: A Restaurant by Cheetos” Campaign.

In 2019, the agency was awarded its Gold Pro Award in “Best Buzz” for the “Flamin' Hot Spot: A Restaurant by Cheetos” Campaign.

In 2019, the agency was awarded its Gold Pro Award in “Best Use of Content Marketing” for the Cheetos “Teach Me How To Curl” Campaign.

In 2019, the agency was awarded its Silver Pro Award in “Best Digital/Social Campaign” for the Cheetos “Teach Me How To Curl” Campaign.

In 2019, the agency was awarded its Gold Pro Award in “Best Use of Video” for the Cheetos “Teach Me How To Curl” Campaign.

In 2019, the agency was awarded its Platinum Pro Award in “Best Overall Campaign” for the Cheetos “Teach Me How To Curl” Campaign.

In 2019, the agency was awarded its Gold REGGIE Award in “Best Content Marketing Campaigns” for the Cheetos “Teach Me How To Curl” Campaign.

In 2019, the agency was awarded its Gold REGGIE Award in “Best National Consumer Campaigns” for the Cheetos “Teach Me How To Curl” Campaign.

In 2019, the agency was awarded its Gold REGGIE Award in “Best Partnership Campaigns” for the Cheetos “Teach Me How To Curl” Campaign.

In 2019, the agency was awarded its Silver REGGIE Award in “Best Experiential Marketing Campaigns” for the State Farm “Neighborhood of Good” Music Festival Experience.

In 2019, the agency was awarded its Gold Ex Award in “Best Consumer Environment” for the State Farm “Neighborhood of Good” Music Festival Experience.

In 2019, the agency was awarded its Gold Ex Award in “Best Single Market Consumer Event” for the Frito Lay Cheetos Restaurant Experience.

In 2019, Chief Marketer awarded the agency it's Platinum PRO Award.

In 2018, Chief Marketer 200 recognized TMA as the overall winner for the Chief Marketer 200 Agency.

In 2018, Design of the Times awarded the agency Gold for “Best Mass Merchandisers Category” for the Tostitos 2017 Back to Football Mascot CTMDs.

In 2018, the agency was awarded its Gold Cannes Lions award in the “Creative Effectiveness Category” for the Cheetos Museum Campaign.

In 2018, TMA was the overall winner for the Event Marketer IT List.

In 2018, the agency was awarded its Grand Ex Award for the State Farm “Neighborhood of Good” Music Festival Experience. 

In 2018, TMA was recognized by the Ex Awards as the “Best Cause/Community Program” for the State Farm “Neighborhood of Good” Music Festival Experience.

In 2018, TMA was recognized by the Ex Awards as the “Best Multicultural Event Campaign” for the State Farm “Color Full Lives” Campaign.

In 2018, TMA was recognized by the Ex Awards as the “Best Pop-Up or Retail Activation” for The Spotted Cheetah Campaign.

In 2018, the agency was awarded its Gold PRO Award in “Best Brand Awareness Campaign” for the State Farm “Color Full Lives” Campaign.

In 2018, the agency was awarded its Silver PRO Award in “Best Multicultural/Lifestyle/Age-Targeted Campaign” for the State Farm “Color Full Lives” Campaign.

In 2018, the agency was awarded its Gold PRO Award in “Best Cause-Based Campaign” for the State Farm “Neighborhood of Good” Music Festival Experience.

In 2018, TMA was recognized as a Finalist in the Effie Awards as “Media Innovation - Existing Channel” for Snickers: A 36 Live Stream Teasing a 30-Second Live Super Bowl Commercial.

In 2018, TMA was recognized as a Finalist in the Effie Awards as “Carpe Diem- Products” for Starburst: All Pink Starburst.

In 2018, the agency was awarded its Gold REGGIE Award in “Best Experiential Marketing” for The Spotted Cheetah Campaign.

In 2018, the agency was awarded its Silver REGGIE Award in “Creativity & Innovation” for The Spotted Cheetah Campaign.

In 2018, the agency was awarded its Silver REGGIE Award in “Best Promotion Marketing Campaigns” for the Doritos Guardians of the Galaxy Vol. 2 Music Bag Campaign.

In 2018, the agency was awarded its Gold REGGIE Award in “Multicultural/Lifestyle” for the State Farm “Color Full Lives” Campaign.

In 2018, the agency was awarded its Bronze REGGIE Award in “Best Purpose Campaigns” for the State Farm “Neighborhood of Good” Music Festival Experience.

In popular culture
In late 2019, State Farm named TMA its new creative agency. TMA’s first ad for the brand brought back Jake from State Farm in February 2020, with Kevin Miles cast as the new Jake. TMA led the creative for State Farm’s first in-game Super Bowl spot in 2021, which featured Patrick Mahomes, Aaron Rodgers, Paul Rudd, and Drake, who served as Jake from State Farm’s stand-in. 

The agency is credited with creating the Doritos "Crash the Super Bowl" promotion, which has earned a Gold Lion at the Cannes Lions International Advertising Festival. 

In 2013, the agency won two Lions at Cannes for its work on the "Uncle Drew" film for Pepsi Max.

Notes

Advertising agencies of the United States
Companies based in Dallas
Marketing companies established in 1992